Gardner State Hospital is a historic mental hospital located in Gardner, Massachusetts. The hospital was closed in 1975, and is now operated as North Central Correctional Institution.

References

External links 
 . (Various documents).
 Asylumprojects.org homepage for Gardner State Hospital

Buildings and structures in Gardner, Massachusetts
Psychiatric hospitals in Massachusetts
Defunct hospitals in Massachusetts